Cynthia Onyedikachi Aku (born 31 December 1999) is a Nigerian professional footballer, who plays as a forward for Ataşehir Belediyespor in the Turkish Women's Football Super League. She represented Nigeria at youth level, before making her debut for the senior team.

Club career 
Aku played in her country for Rivers Angels in the Nigeria Women Premier League.

In the beginning of 2022, she moved to Turkey, and joined the Istanbul-based club Kireçburnu Spor to play in the 2021-22 Turkish Women's Football Super League. On 14 October 2022, she transferred to Ataşehir Belediyespor for the 2022-23 Women's Super League season.

International career 
At the 2019 WAFU Zone B Women's Cup, Aku was named player of the match in Nigeria's 15–0 victory against Niger.

References

External links 
 

1999 births
Living people
Women's association football forwards
Nigerian women's footballers
Rivers Angels F.C. players
Nigeria women's international footballers
Nigerian expatriate women's footballers
Turkish Women's Football Super League players
Nigerian expatriate sportspeople in Turkey
Expatriate women's footballers in Turkey
Kireçburnu Spor players
Ataşehir Belediyespor players